Paranthrene diaphana is a moth of the family Sesiidae. It is found in Croatia, Bosnia and Herzegovina, Serbia and Montenegro, the Republic of Macedonia and Bulgaria, as well as Turkey, Azerbaijan and Iran.

The larvae feed on Populus and Salix species (including Salix alba). They mine the trunks of their host plant. Adult females preferably deposit their eggs in injured parts of the host tree.

References

Moths described in 1925
Sesiidae
Moths of Europe